Kəbirli (also, Kebirli and Kyabirli) is a village and municipality in the Tartar Rayon of Azerbaijan.  It has a population of 702.

References 

Populated places in Tartar District